Tatiana Blattnerová (born 16 March 2002) is a Slovakian Paralympic swimmer who competes in international swimming competitions. She is a three-time World medalist and a European silver medalist, she has also competed at the 2020 Summer Paralympics where she did not medal.

References

2002 births
Living people
Sportspeople from Bratislava
Paralympic swimmers of Slovakia
Swimmers at the 2020 Summer Paralympics
Medalists at the World Para Swimming Championships
Medalists at the World Para Swimming European Championships